Gordon McCallum (26 May 1919 – 10 September 1989) was an American-born English sound engineer. He won an Academy Award for Best Sound and was nominated for three more in the same category. He worked on more than 300 films between 1944 and 1985.

Selected filmography
McCallum won an Academy Award and was nominated for three more:

Won
 Fiddler on the Roof (1971)

Nominated
 Ryan's Daughter (1970)
 Diamonds Are Forever (1971)
 Superman (1978)

References

External links

1919 births
1989 deaths
British audio engineers
People from Chicago
Best Sound BAFTA Award winners
Best Sound Mixing Academy Award winners